Matt Hunter may refer to:

Matt Hunter (mountain biker) (born 1983), Canadian sportsman
Matt Hunter (singer) (born 1998), American Latin-influenced pop singer, now known as Matt Hunter Correa
Matt Hunter (General Hospital), fictional character in American TV series General Hospital

See also
Hunter (name)